Haiti is the eighty-fifth most populous country in the world, with an estimated population of 11,123,178 as of July 2018. According to population DNA tests, approximately 85% of the population of Haiti is Afro-Haitian. Within Black Haitian DNA the composition is approximately 95% African, 5% European or mixed European. The remaining population of Haiti is primarily composed of Mulattoes, Europeans, Asians, and Arabs. Hispanic residents in Haiti are mostly Cuban and Dominican. About two-thirds of Haitian people live in rural areas.

Although a national census was taken in Haiti in 2003, much of that data has not been released. Several demographic studies, including those by social work researcher Athena Kolbe, have provided estimates the demographic information of urban residents. In 2006, each Haitian household had an average of 4.5 members.

Population of Haiti
In 2015, the proportion of children below the age of 15 was 36.2%. 59.7% of the population was between 15 and 65 years of age, while 4.5% was 65 years or older. According to the World Bank, Haiti's dependency rate is 7.51 dependents per 100 working age persons.

Structure of the population 

Structure of the population (1 July 2010) (Estimates):

Structure of the population (01.07.2011) (Estimates):

Structure of the population (DHS 2012) (Males 28,122, Females 29,844 = 57,966):

Vital statistics
The registration of vital events in Haiti is incomplete. The Population Department of the United Nations prepared the following estimates. Population estimates account for under numeration in population censuses.

While limited, some evidence suggests that large scale disasters can cause human populations to increase in the long term, rather than decrease. Accordingly, in Haiti's case, some sources reported that a tripled fertility rate was expected after the 2010 Haiti earthquake. However, data since then does not show a diversion from the pre-disaster trend of decreasing fertility rates.

Births and deaths 

Number of births and deaths are calculated based on Crude Birth and Death Rates.

Fertility and births
The Total Fertility Rate (TFR) (Wanted Fertility Rate) and Crude Birth Rate (CBR):

Other sources of demographic statistics 

Demographic statistics below are based on the 2022 World Population Review.

One birth every 2 minutes	
One death every 5 minutes	
One net migrant every 16 minutes	
Net gain of one person every 4 minutes

Demographic statistics below are based on the CIA World Factbook, unless otherwise indicated.

Population
11,334,637 (2022 est.)
10,788,440 (July 2018 est.)

Ethnic composition
Black 95%, mixed and White 5%

Age structure
Haiti's population pyramid can be categorized as "expansive," indicating a growing population. However, it is categorized as being at stage 3 of demographic transition, as the birth and death rate are falling and net population is increasing at a slower rate.
0-14 years: 31.21% (male 1,719,961/female 1,734,566)
15-24 years: 20.71% (male 1,145,113/female 1,146,741)
25-54 years: 38.45% (male 2,110,294/female 2,145,209)
55-64 years: 5.3% (male 280,630/female 305,584)
65 years and over: 4.33% (2020 est.) (male 210,451/female 269,228)

0-14 years: 32.27% (male 1,733,920 / female 1,747,387)
15-24 years: 21.11% (male 1,139,188 / female 1,137,754)
25-54 years: 37.32% (male 1,997,816 / female 2,028,495)
55-64 years: 5.1% (male 262,494 / female 287,515)
65 years and over: 4.21% (male 199,617 / female 254,254) (2018 est.)

Birth rate
21.12 births/1,000 population (2022 est.) Country comparison to the world: 65th
22.6 births/1,000 population (2018 est.) Country ranking: 65/195

Death rate
7.23 deaths/1,000 population (2022 est.) Country comparison to the world: 113rd
7.5 deaths/1,000 population (2018 est.) Country comparison to the world: 111st

Total fertility rate
2.43 children born/woman (2022 est.) Country comparison to the world: 72nd
2.66 children born/woman (2018 est.) Country comparison to the world: 65th

Net migration rate
-1.88 migrant(s)/1,000 population (2022 est.) Country comparison to the world: 169th
-2 migrant(s)/1,000 population (2018 est.) Country comparison to the world: 163rd

Population growth rate
1.2% (2022 est.) Country comparison to the world: 77th
1.31% (2018 est.) Country comparison to the world: 84th

Median age
total: 24.1 years. Country comparison to the world: 167th
male: 23.8 years
female: 24.3 years (2020 est.)

Total: 23.3 years. Country ranking: 172/195
Male: 23.1 years
Female: 23.6 years (2018 est.)

Mother's mean age at first birth
22.8 years (2016/7 est.)
note: median age at first birth among women 25-29

Contraceptive prevalence rate
34.3% (2016/17)

Dependency ratios
total dependency ratio: 62.3 (2015 est.)
youth dependency ratio: 54.8 (2015 est.)
elderly dependency ratio: 7.5 (2015 est.)
potential support ratio: 13.3 (2015 est.)

Life expectancy at birth

total population: 64.6 years 
male: 61.9 years 
female: 67.2 years (2018 est.)

Urbanization
urban population: 58.8% of total population (2022)
rate of urbanization: 2.47% annual rate of change (2020-25 est.)

urban population: 55.3% of total population (2018)
rate of urbanization: 2.9% annual rate of change (2015-20 est.)

Religions
Catholic 55%, Protestant 29%, Vodou 2.1%, other 4.6%, none 10% (2018 est.)
note: 50-80% of Haitians incorporate some elements of Vodou culture or practice in addition to another religion, most often Roman Catholicism; Vodou was recognized as an official religion in 2003

Education expenditures
1.7% of GDP (2018) Country comparison to the world: 183rd
2.4% of GDP (2016) Country comparison to the world: 162nd

Literacy
Definition: age 15 and over can read and write (2015 est.)
total population: 61.7%
male: 65.3%
female: 58.3% (2016)

Major infectious diseases
degree of risk: very high (2020)
food or waterborne diseases: bacterial and protozoal diarrhea, hepatitis A and E, and typhoid fever
vectorborne diseases: dengue fever and malaria

Languages
French (official)
 Haitian Creole (official)

Languages
Taíno was the major pre-Columbian language in the region of what is Haiti (or Ayti), a name referring to the entire island of Hispaniola. The phrase means "land of high mountains."

Today, the Republic of Haiti has two official languages, French and Haitian Creole. Haitian Creole is a French-based creole with 90% of its vocabulary derived from or influenced by Portuguese, Spanish, Taíno, and various West African languages. French is the primary written and administrative language (as well as the main language of the press) and is spoken by 42% of Haitians. The language is generally spoken by educated Haitians, is the medium of instruction in most schools, and is used in the business sector. It is also spoken in ceremonial events such as weddings, graduations, and church masses.

Haiti is one of two independent nations in the Americas (along with Canada) to designate French as an official language; other French-speaking areas are all overseas départements, or collectivités, of France. Haitian Creole, which was recently standardized, is spoken by virtually the entire population of Haiti. It is related to the other French creoles but most closely to the Antillean Creole and Louisiana Creole variants.

Spanish is spoken by some Haitians along the border with the Dominican Republic, as well as by some who have been deported from Spanish-speaking countries. English is used increasingly within the business sector, but only by a small proportion of the total population.

Religion

The most common religions in Haiti are Roman Catholicism, Pentecostalism and Baptist. The state religion is Roman Catholicism, which is professed by 55–60% of the population. 30–35% of Haitians practice Protestantism, mostly Pentecostalism, which arrived in Haiti in the 1970s. Almost 99% of Haitians claim to be a part of at least one religion, with a fraction of them practicing some part of Vodou along with another religion.

Vodou bears similarities to Cuban Santeria due to the large Cuban population in Haiti. The practice of Vodou revolves around family spirits called Lwa that protect children. To repay the spirits, children perform two ceremonies where the Lwa are given gifts like food and drinks. The timing of the ceremonies depends on the monetary status of the family performing them; poorer families try to save money, waiting until there is a need to perform the rituals. The practice of Vodou is rare among the urban elite.

Modern day Vodou has been shaped by both Protestant and Catholic Christianity. Under the rule of the Catholic French, the population was not allowed to practice Vodou. However, they were occasionally allowed to have dances on the weekends. These dances were actually disguised Vodou services. The underground practice of Vodou continued until Haiti gained its independence in 1804. Most Haitians see practicing both Vodou and Christianity as normal due to their significant similarities. The Catholic Church, however, was not always as accepting of Vodou. In 1941-42, a holy war was declared against Vodou, leading to the deaths of many high level religious officials in the Vodou religion. Persecution of the religion largely ended in 1950 when the Catholics gave up trying to prosecute those who practiced Vodou. Protestants, however, are still critical of the religion, often describing it as "devil worship".

A fictionalized version of Vodou, commonly called "voodoo", has been used in American movies and by authors such as H.P. Lovecraft. Vodou and voodoo are not the conceptually the same, although the idea of "voodoo" lives on in American pop culture.

Education

Although public education in Haiti at the primary level is free, private and parochial schools provide around 75% of educational programs offered to the public.

In recent years, several literacy campaigns launched by the Martelly administration have increased adult literacy in Haiti.  UNESCO projects an overall literacy rate of 61.1% in Haiti by 2015.

As of December 2014, the World Bank has reported an increase in school enrollment from 78% to 90% in Haiti, close to the federal goal of universal child enrollment.

Labor
In 2004, approximately 300,000 children were restavecs, or indentured servants.

Emigration
Large-scale emigration, principally to the Dominican Republic, United States, and Canada (predominantly to Quebec) has created what Haitians refer to as the Eleventh Department or the Diaspora. Significant numbers of Haitians have also immigrated to Cuba, France and French Guiana, Spain, Belgium, the United Kingdom and Ireland, Venezuela, Brazil, Chile, the Bahamas and other Caribbean countries. Approximately one in every six Haitians lives abroad.

Immigration
45,000 Americans live in Haiti. They represent 0.4% of Haiti's total population.

References